Pedro Pablo Cepeda Sierra (born 29 June 1966) is a Mexican politician from the National Action Party. From 2000 to 2003 he served as Deputy of the LVIII Legislature of the Mexican Congress representing San Luis Potosí, and previously served in the Congress of San Luis Potosí.

References

1966 births
Living people
Politicians from San Luis Potosí
National Action Party (Mexico) politicians
21st-century Mexican politicians
Autonomous University of San Luis Potosi alumni
Members of the Congress of San Luis Potosí
Deputies of the LVIII Legislature of Mexico
Members of the Chamber of Deputies (Mexico) for San Luis Potosí